Piabarchus is a genus of characins from tropical South America.

Species
There are currently 3 recognized species in this genus:
 Piabarchus analis (C. H. Eigenmann, 1914)
 Piabarchus stramineus (C. H. Eigenmann, 1908) 
 Piabarchus torrenticola Mahnert & Géry, 1988

References

Characidae
Taxa named by George S. Myers
Fish of South America